DJ Lord (born Lord Aswod on March 11, 1975 in Savannah, Georgia, United States), is an American DJ and turntablist. In 1999, DJ Lord joined the hip hop group Public Enemy on its 40th World Tour  replacing Terminator X. Soon after, DJ Lord had his own performance segment within the Public Enemy show. While hip hop has been at the foundation of his career, he also works in the drum and bass arena. His career and the art of turntablism is documented in the DVD, DJ Lord - The Turntablist Chronicles, released in 2004.

In addition to working with Public Enemy, DJ Lord tours solo as well as with Flavor Flav in his solo effort as well as with art exhibition Arts, Beats + Lyrics. He has also performed with rock band Confrontation Camp and TrillBass. In December 2014 he released his first solo album with 2MP (2 Much Posse) entitled “Eat The Rat” on Spit Digital.

DJ Lord was also a member of Prophets of Rage.

DJ Lord performed with Cypress Hill on their West Coast High Tour in Portland, Oregon in March 2019, and also performed a solo DJ set there before the other Cypress Hill members came to the stage.

Battle career highlights
 2004 – DMC U.S. Finalist 
 2004 – DMC Cincinnati Regional Heat Champion 
 2004 – Numark/Guitar Center Southeast Champion 
 2004 – KoolMixx Atlanta Battle Champion 
 2003 – KoolMixx Atlanta Battle Champion 
 2003 – Breaklanta 3 Battle Champion 
 2002 – Breaklanta 1 Battle Champion 
 2002 – Pioneer/Promo Only CDJ1000 CD Turntable Champion 
 2001 – DMC U.S. Finalist 
 2001 – DMC Phoenix Arizona Regional Champion 
 2001 – Guitar Center/Stanton Southeast Battle Champion 
 2000 – Guitar Center/Vestax Southeast Battle Champion 
 2000 – KoolMixx Atlanta Battle Champion

References

External links
  DJ Lord
  Public Enemy

American hip hop DJs
Musicians from Savannah, Georgia
Living people
Musicians from Atlanta
1975 births
Public Enemy (band) members
Prophets of Rage members